This article is about the grading that is used in Hong Kong.

Universities
In Hong Kong, the system of grade point average (GPA) is used in universities.

Some universities don't include A+ in the grades, or set the grade point of A+ to be 4.00, so that the maximum GPA attainable is 4.00 instead of 4.30. Some universities use a 12-point based system called "CGA" instead.  Some universities do not include minus grades (i.e., no A−, B−, C−) and the grade point of A+, B+, C+, D+ is 4.5, 3.5, 2.5, 1.5 respectively. Yet, The Hong Kong Polytechnic University caps all GPA values at 4.0.

Definitions
 Grade A: Excellent
 Grade B: Good
 Grade C: Adequate
 Grade D: Marginal pass
 Grade F: Fail

Hong Kong Certificate of Education Examination and Hong Kong Advanced Level Examination

Results of the Hong Kong Certificate of Education Examination (HKCEE) and Hong Kong Advanced Level Examination (HKALE) are expressed in terms of six grades A to F, of which grade A is the highest and F the lowest. Results below grade F are designated as unclassified (UNCL). HKCEE and HKALE have been completely replaced by the Hong Kong Diploma of Secondary Education Examination in 2013. The last HKCEE were held in 2012 and the last HKALE will be held in 2013 for private candidates only.

Common grade definition of HKCEE and HKALE recognized by the general public

 Grade A: Distinction or GCSE/GCE A*
 Grade B: Credit or GCSE/GCE A*/A
 Grade C: Credit or GCSE/GCE A
 Grade D: Pass or GCSE/GCE B
 Grade E: Pass or GCSE/GCE C
 Grade F: Failed
 UNCL: Unclassified

Note:
 Grade C or above in a HKCEE subject is recognised as equivalent to an O-level pass (grade C or better) in an overseas GCE examination. But Grade E in HKCEE is commonly recognized as a pass for most employers and education institutes in Hong Kong.
 Grade E or above in HKALE subject is recognised as equivalent to a pass (Grade E or above) in a British oversea GCE examination.
 Since 2007, HKCEE and HKALE grades could be regarded as 2 grades higher than their IGCSE and UK A-Levels counterparts (e.g. a C in HKALE is comparable to an A in GCE A-levels), except English and Chinese as they are subject to a different comparison standard

Hong Kong Diploma of Secondary Education Examination
For Category A subjects in HKDSE, results will be expressed in terms of five levels, of which level 5 is the highest and level 1 the lowest. Distinction levels 5** and 5* (pronounced as Five-Double-Star and Five-Star) will be awarded to the two best-performing groups of candidates attaining Level 5.

Common grade definition of HKDSE recognized by the general public

References

Hong Kong
Grading
Grading